The Canadian Alliance of Student Associations (CASA) is a federally focused student advocacy organization. CASA currently has 24 members, who represent over 275,000 students from across Canada. With a formal partnership with the Quebec Student Union, CASA represents 365,000 students. CASA works towards an accessible, affordable, innovative and high-quality post-secondary education system.

History
CASA's origins can be traced to the first Winds of Change conference hosted by the University of Alberta in 1990. In what would become an annual meeting, student leaders from across the country were invited to come together to discuss challenges facing post-secondary education students in Canada.

In 1993 the federal government announced that all of Canada's social programs would be reviewed with sweeping and significant changes likely to come which prompted several student unions not affiliated with the CFS to try to organize efforts to lobby the federal government on education issues.

In 1994, as the result of a conference held at Carleton University, a number of student leaders decided to form a new Canadian post-secondary student organization. The foundations for the new organization were laid down, and the framework for a constitution was built upon it.

CASA was incorporated June 27, 1995. CASA currently has members in seven provinces and represents undergraduate, graduate, college and polytechnic students.

Board of Directors 
CASA has a Board of Directors that helps guide the home office staff. This board is made up of a chair, secretary, treasurer, and four directors-at-large. The director-at-large positions include a Director of Policy, Director of Advocacy, Director of Membership, and Director of Equity, Diversity, and Inclusion.

References

External links

Students' associations in Canada
Political advocacy groups in Canada
Groups of students' unions
Student political organizations
1995 establishments in Canada